The Reverend John Elder (January 26, 1706July 17, 1792), known as the "Fighting Pastor", was the pastor for the Paxtang congregation, located in present-day Dauphin County, Pennsylvania, near Harrisburg.  He founded the Paxton Boys.

Biography and career
Elder was born in Edinburgh, the son of Robert and Eleanor Elder.  He was raised and educated there, receiving a classical education at the University of Edinburgh and then he studied divinity, receiving a licence to preach the gospel in 1732.  His father had emigrated to central Pennsylvania , Elder followed .  A ministry opened when the Derry congregation split in two, and Elder was called and ordained by the Paxtang congregation.

The First Great Awakening had reached the area shortly afterwards.  Elder opposed the revivalist furore.  He was accused and formally cleared of heresy.  He stood firmly with the "Old Side" in the resulting split amongst Presbyterian churches, which lasted about twenty years.

The French and Indian War led to conflict with local Indians.  Elder organized a local militia known as the Paxton Boys.  He and most male congregants brought their rifles to church.  After the war was over, Elder was commissioned as a colonel.  Killings of Indians continued, culminating in the "Conestoga Massacre".  Elder excused the killings, refused to identify suspects, and was relieved of his command.

During the Revolution, he used his pulpit to round up volunteers, including two of his sons.

In his personal life, he married twice.  He had 4 children by his first wife, and 11 children by his second wife, of whom 10 survived to adulthood.  His son Thomas would become a prominent Harrisburg lawyer and businessman.

Notes

Further reading
 
 
 
 
 
John Elder at find a grave memorial

1706 births
1792 deaths
Clergy from Edinburgh
Alumni of the University of Edinburgh
People of colonial Pennsylvania
People from Dauphin County, Pennsylvania
Scottish emigrants to the Thirteen Colonies